Chuang Chia-jung and Hsieh Su-wei were the defending champions, but chose not to participate that year.

Anabel Medina Garrigues and Caroline Wozniacki won in the final 6–1, 6–3, against Han Xinyun and Xu Yifan.

Seeds

Draw

External links 
Tournament Draws

China Open
2008 China Open (tennis)